The 2009 Falken Tasmania Challenge was the fourth race meeting of the 2009 V8 Supercar Championship Series. It contained Races 7 and 8 of the series and was held on the weekend of May 29–31 at Symmons Plains Raceway, near Launceston, in northern Tasmania.

Rule change
The new race formats for 2009 saw a 100 kilometre race held as Race 7 on Saturday, with a 200 kilometre race held on Sunday as Race 8.

Race 7
The first race was held on Saturday May 30. Garth Tander was able to break the year long stranglehold Team Vodafone has held on the 2009 series, taking a narrow victory over Russell Ingall after an innovative use of tyre tactics saw Ingall get much better tyre life out of his set of soft, sprint, tyres. Instead of changing tyres at his pitstop to a set of the harder, slow tyres, Ingall rotated his tyres, swapping the tyres diagonally front/rear and left/right, giving him the best grip of any of the front runners in the races late stages and it was only Tander's ability to put lapped traffic between himself and Ingall that gave the Holden Racing Team driver the race victory.

Steven Johnson continued his best ever V8 Supercar season with a third place, and best of the Ford drivers. It was Johnson's second podium result of the year after claiming third at Race 4 at the Hamilton 400. Will Davison backed up Tander's win in fourth place, making it the best day of the season for HRT ahead of Todd Kelly, his best result of the year to date, and Stone Brothers race Shane van Gisbergen. Team mates Craig Lowndes and Jamie Whincup followed with a much improved Greg Murphy ninth and a disappointing Lee Holdsworth scraping into the top ten.

James Courtney had a miserable day, involved in several on track skirmishes, including receiving a puncture and pitting on the very lap that his team mate Steven Johnson was already in the pits having his scheduled pitstop, forcing Courtney to lose yet more time waiting for his team to service Johnson's #17 Ford. He finished, but finished last on a day when all 30 cars saw the chequered flag. His championship hopes are effectively extinguished and his hopes for a good season will now hinge on his ability to win races.

Race 8
Race 8 was held on Sunday May 31.

Results

Qualifying Race 7

Race 7

Qualifying Race 8

Race 8

* Penalties were applied to Tim Slade and Marcus Marshall. Slade was relegated from ninth to 14th. Marshall was relegated from 22nd to 24th.

Standings
 After Round 4 of 14

References

External links
Official series website
Official timing and results

Falken Tasmania Challenge
May 2009 sports events in Australia